MyGlamm is an Indian e-commerce company that sells cosmetics and personal care products. It was founded in 2015, headquartered in Mumbai, India. The company is owned by The Good Glamm Group and Sanghvi Technologies. In 2021, the company became the first Indian unicorn startup in the DTC beauty and personal care business.

History 
MyGlamm was founded in 2015 by Darpan Sanghvi as an at-home beauty salon service. In 2017, it was relaunched as an online cosmetic beauty company in India. In December 2018, it launched its luxury category, Manish Malhotra Haute-Couture Makeup, in partnership with fashion designer Manish Malhotra. In December 2020, the company launched the Manish Malhotra Luxe Artisanal Skincare range. As of September 2021, it has 20,000 POS across 70 cities in India.

In November 2020, MyGlamm launched an experiential store of 3000 square foot in Juhu, Mumbai. In October 2021, the company entered the haircare segment with its MyGlamm Superfoods range.

Acquisitions 
In August 2020, MyGlamm acquired the digital media platform POPxo and influencer marketing company Plixxo, both founded by Priyanka Gill in 2014 and 2017, respectively. In August 2021, MyGlamm acquired the parenting platform Baby Chakra for an undisclosed sum to expand its operations in South Asia.

In October 2021, the company acquired the D2C brand, The Moms Com, for 500 crore, followed by the acquisition of ScoopWhoop, a digital media company. It made its fifth acquisition by acquiring Miss Malini Entertainment for an undisclosed sum.
It bought a majority stake in Organic Harvest, an organic personal care brand, in January 2022.

Funding 
In April 2016, MyGlamm raised US$6 million as part of a Series A round from French personal care retailer L'Occitane en Provence, private equity fund Tano Capital and Brand Capital. It received $15 million in the second round of funding from Tano Capital in August 2018. In 2021, the company secured $4.35 million as part of a Series B round of funding from Tano India Private Equity, L'Occitane International, Bessemer Venture Partners, Trifecta Venture Debt Fund II and the company's founder Darpan Sanghavi through Rights Issue. In June 2019, it secured raised US$14.42 million in a round led by Bessemer Venture Partners, L'Ocitane and Mankekar Family Office. As of March 2021, it was valued at US$500 million and had raised $24 million in a Series C round, led by Ascent Capital Group, Amazon and Wipro. In November 2021, it became a unicorn after raising $150 million at a valuation of $1.2 billion.

Business model 
MyGlamm is a Direct-to-consumer business that operates on a hybrid online-offline model, generating about 60 percent of sales online and the rest from offline. The company began its operation in 2015 as an on-demand beauty service through which customers could reserve a home spa or beauty and hair care service. However, in 2017, the company changed its business model by introducing its cosmetic products in the market.

Advertising 
In December 2018, the company ran an advertising campaign #TestedOnSid, in which actor Siddharth Malhotra was seen endorsing MyGlamm's product. Various news outlets reported it as the first male actor to endorse a female cosmetic brand. In March 2020, a video ad was released featuring actress Sonakshi Sinha. In June 2021, actress Shraddha Kapoor was appointed as the company's brand ambassador, who also invested in the company with an undisclosed amount. In September 2021, it launched its second TVC introducing the MyGlamm Superfoods Kajal. In October 2021, its third TVC was released featuring Sonam Kapoor.

Sponsorship 
The company has sponsored the Filmfare OTT Awards for the year 2021. It was a presenting sponsor for the 7th season of the TV reality talk show Koffee with Karan.

See also 
 E-commerce in India
 Online shopping

References

External links 
 

Indian companies established in 2015
Beauty organisations
Online retailers of India
Companies based in Mumbai
2015 establishments in Karnataka
Retail companies of India
Indian brands